The following are the national records in athletics in South Sudan maintained by its national athletics federation: South Sudan Athletics Federation.

Outdoor

Key to tables:

NWI = no wind measurement

# = not recognised by IAAF

OT = oversized track (> 200m in circumference)

Men

Women

Indoor

Men

Women

Notes

References
General
World Athletics Statistic Handbook 2022: National Outdoor Records
World Athletics Statistic Handbook 2022: National Indoor Records
Specific

External links
SSAF on Facebook

South Sudan
Records